Jewish Community Center of White Sulphur Springs, also known as White Sulpher Springs Synagogue, is a historic synagogue located at White Sulphur Springs in Sullivan County, New York.  It was built in 1934 and is a rectangular, 1-story building built into a hillside.  It is a three-by-five-bay frame structure clad in asbestos-cement tiles.  The front facade features a stepped, pedimented parapet that extends beyond the roofline. 
It was added to the National Register of Historic Places in 1999.

References

Synagogues in Sullivan County, New York
National Register of Historic Places in Sullivan County, New York
Synagogues on the National Register of Historic Places in New York (state)
Religious buildings and structures completed in 1934
Synagogues completed in 1934
1934 establishments in New York (state)